The Defender is a novel by F. J. Thwaites.

In 1937 it was announced a film version of the novel would be made at National Studios, following production of The Flying Doctor, but the movie did not eventuate.

References

External links

1936 Australian novels